Egriqash (also Romanized as Egrīqāsh; also known as Garīfāsh) is a village in Mokriyan-e Gharbi Rural District, in the Central District of Mahabad County, West Azerbaijan Province, Iran. At the 2006 census, its population was 2,911, in 578 families.

Name 
Historically, the name of this village was Indirqash, of unknown origin, which was transformed by folk etymology into Azeri Turkish Ägri-qash ("crooked eyebrow") or Hündür-qash ("high eyebrow").

History 
After the Iranian Revolution in 1979, Shia Azerbaijani recruits in the Islamic Revolutionary Guard Corps entered Egriqash and massacred the local Kurdish population.

References 

Populated places in Mahabad County
Kurdish settlements in West Azerbaijan Province